The 2016–17 St. Francis Brooklyn Terriers women's basketball team represents St. Francis College during the 2016–17 NCAA Division I women's basketball season.  The Terrier's home games are played at the Generoso Pope Athletic Complex. The team has been a member of the Northeast Conference since 1988. St. Francis Brooklyn was coached by John  Thurston, who is in his fifth year at the helm of the Terriers. They finished the season 8–22, 6–12 in NEC play to finish in a tie for seventh place. They lost in the quarterfinals of the NEC tournament to Sacred Heart.

Roster

Schedule and results

|-
!colspan=12 style="background:#0038A8; border: 2px solid #CE1126;;color:#FFFFFF;"| Non-Conference Regular Season

|-
!colspan=12 style="background:#0038A8; border: 2px solid #CE1126;;color:#FFFFFF;"| NEC Regular Season

  

   
|-
!colspan=12 style="background:#0038A8; border: 2px solid #CE1126;;color:#FFFFFF;"| Northeast Conference tournament

|-

See also
2016–17 St. Francis Brooklyn Terriers men's basketball team

References

Saint Francis Brooklyn
St. Francis Brooklyn Terriers women's basketball seasons
Saint Francis Brooklyn Terriers women's basketball
Saint Francis Brooklyn Terriers women's basketball